T. J. Edward Wilson (born February 13, 1975) is an American heavyweight boxer who won the U.S. Amateur Super Heavyweight championship in 2000.

Early years
TJ Edward Wilson Jr was born February 13, 1975, in Atlanta, Georgia, where he competed as an amateur boxer. A tall southpaw Wilson had a successful amateur career. The counter puncher was an Olympic alternate in 1996 and was the American boxer at the World Championships 1997 where he lost early to eventual runner-up Alexis Rubalcaba.

He crowned his career with a win at the United States amateur (AAU) Super Heavyweight championships in 2000. He beat 1999 national champion Calvin Brock in the Olympic qualification, too, but lost the rematch 5:6 again having to settle for alternate. He also beat Dominic Guinn in the amateurs.

Professional career
He turned pro afterwards but suffered a major disappointment getting knocked out by clubfighter Willie Chapman.

In 2007 he knocked out undefeated prospect Travis Walker in just 15 seconds. He lost the rematch by knockout.

As of February 2008 Wilson's professional record was 12-2 with 8 knockouts.

References

External links
 

1975 births
Living people
Heavyweight boxers
Winners of the United States Championship for amateur boxers
Boxers from Oklahoma
Sportspeople from Tulsa, Oklahoma
American male boxers